Farzana Nazir (born 12 December 1965) is a Pakistani politician who was a Member of the Provincial Assembly of the Punjab, from 2002 to 2007 and again from May 2013 to May 2018.

Early life and education
She was born on 12 December 1965.

She earned a Bachelor of Medicine and Bachelor of Surgery in 1990 from University of the Punjab.

Political career

She was elected to the Provincial Assembly of the Punjab as a candidate of Pakistan Muslim League (Q) on a reserved seat for women in 2002 Pakistani general election.

She was re-elected to the Provincial Assembly of the Punjab as a candidate of Pakistan Muslim League (N) on a reserved seat for women in 2013 Pakistani general election.

References

Living people
Women members of the Provincial Assembly of the Punjab
Punjab MPAs 2013–2018
1965 births
Pakistan Muslim League (N) politicians
Punjab MPAs 2002–2007
21st-century Pakistani women politicians